The Hiram Sands House is an historic house in Cambridge, Massachusetts.  It is a -story brick structure, three bays wide, with a side-gable roof.  Its gable ends are fully pedimented in the Greek Revival style, but the heavy brackets and modillions on the cornice are Italianate features, as are the window hoods and front porch.  The house was built in 1848 by the second of three generations of Cambridge brickmakers, from clay dug nearby, and incorporates elements of both the Greek Revival and Italianate architectural styles. It was added to the National Register of Historic Places in 1976.

See also
National Register of Historic Places listings in Cambridge, Massachusetts

References

Houses on the National Register of Historic Places in Cambridge, Massachusetts
Houses completed in 1848